Thomas Cleveland West (born July 31, 1954) is an American football coach and former player. He is currently the defensive line coach at Middle Tennessee State University. West served as head football coach at the University of Tennessee at Chattanooga (1993), Clemson University (1993–1998) and the University of Memphis (2001–2009), compiling a career college football record of 84–96. West was fired as head coach at Memphis on November 9, 2009 after beginning the season 2–7. West finished the season with Memphis.

West attended Gainesville High School in Gainesville, Georgia, from which he graduated in 1972. There he was a letterman in football, basketball, and baseball. In football, he was an All-American selection, and was also drafted in fifth round of the Major League Baseball Draft by the Chicago Cubs. He is married to the former Cyndie Smith of Germantown, Tennessee, and has one son, Turner West, who is an assistant at Georgia Southern University.

Head coaching record

Notes

References

External links
 Middle Tennessee profile

1954 births
Living people
American football tight ends
Ole Miss Rebels football coaches
Appalachian State Mountaineers football coaches
Chattanooga Mocs football coaches
Clemson Tigers football coaches
Memphis Tigers football coaches
Middle Tennessee Blue Raiders football coaches
Southern Miss Golden Eagles football coaches
South Carolina Gamecocks football coaches
Tennessee Volunteers football coaches
Tennessee Volunteers football players
UAB Blazers football coaches
People from Carrollton, Georgia
People from Gainesville, Georgia
Sportspeople from the Atlanta metropolitan area
Coaches of American football from Georgia (U.S. state)
Players of American football from Georgia (U.S. state)